Joshua Kelly (born 12 February 1995) is a professional Australian rules footballer playing for the Greater Western Sydney Giants in the Australian Football League (AFL). He was recruited by the Greater Western Sydney Giants with the second overall selection in the 2013 national draft.

Kelly had a breakout year in 2017, winning inclusion in the All-Australian team and finishing fifth in the Brownlow Medal. He was named in the Greater Western Sydney Giants leadership group in 2018 where he remains as Vice-Captain. Josh Kelly began his football career as an Auskicker at East Brighton in Melbourne's south-east before being drafted at pick two in the 2013 NAB AFL Draft. Kelly is the son of Phil Kelly, who played 61 games as a wingman for North Melbourne in the 1980s and won two Sandover Medals in the WAFL. He won the GIANTS Rising Star Award in his first season and become a mainstay of the Giants' midfield in just a few short years. Kelly was elevated into the club's official leadership group ahead of the 2017 season in just his fourth year in the AFL, and after a stunning 2017 season was named vice-captain in 2018.

In December 2021, Kelly was named, along with Toby Greene and incumbent Stephen Coniglio, as co-captain of the club. In February 2023, Kelly and Coniglio were named vice-captains as Greene was named the sole captain.

AFL career
He is the son of Phil Kelly, who played 109 games and won multiple Sandover Medals for East Perth in the West Australian Football League and then moved to the Victorian Football League, playing 61 games for the Kangaroos from 1981-85. He also has a younger sister, Laine Kelly.
During the AFL combine he showed elite endurance, finishing the 3 km time trial with a time of 9 minutes and 32 seconds (the second fastest ever in testing). He was educated at Brighton Grammar School, alongside fellow 2013 draftees Christian Salem and Jayden Hunt.

Kelly had a stellar 2017 season, being named in the All-Australian team and finishing fifth in the Brownlow Medal. In the opening rounds of the season, it was confirmed that North Melbourne had made a $9 million contract offer. He eventually re-signed with the Giants at the end of the year on a 2-year contract; the amount was not disclosed.

Kelly was a key member of the Giants‘ 2019 finals campaign which saw the team reach its first grand final. He managed 27 disposals and was named in the best players in the team’s four point preliminary final win against Collingwood.

Statistics
Statistics are correct to the end of the first week of the 2021 finals

|- style="background-color: #EAEAEA"
| 2014 ||  || 22 || 18 || 13 || 7 || 168 || 144 || 312 || 55 || 58 || 0.7 || 0.4 || 9.3 || 8.0 || 17.3 || 3.1 || 3.2 || 0
|- class="sortbottom"
| 2015 ||  || 22 || 18 || 7 || 12 || 172 || 150 || 322 || 70 || 66 || 0.4 || 0.7 || 9.6 || 8.3 || 17.9 || 3.9 || 3.7 || 0
|- style="background-color: #EAEAEA"
| 2016 ||  || 22 || 24 || 14 || 16 || 301 || 265 || 566 || 90 || 94 || 0.6 || 0.7 || 12.5 || 11.0 || 23.6 || 3.8 || 3.9 || 6
|- class="sortbottom"
| 2017 ||  || 22 || 24 || 19 || 24 || 338 || 370 || 708 || 85 || 156 || 0.8 || 1.0 || 14.1 || 15.4 || 29.5 || 3.5 || 6.5 || 21
|- style="background-color: #EAEAEA"
| 2018 ||  || 22 || 16 || 10 || 13 || 253 || 168 || 421 || 58 || 82 || 0.6 || 0.8 || 15.8 || 10.5 || 26.3 || 3.6 || 5.1 || 10
|- class="sortbottom"
| 2019 ||  || 22 || 17 || 14 || 11 || 281 || 211 || 492 || 67 || 90 || 0.8 || 0.6 || 16.5 || 12.4 || 28.9 || 3.9 || 5.3 || 11
|- style=background:#EAEAEA
| scope=row | 2020 ||  || 22 
| 14 || 5 || 8 || 177 || 132 || 309 || 42 || 58 || 0.3 || 0.5 || 12.6 || 9.4 || 22.0 || 3.0 || 4.1 || 5
|- class="sortbottom"
| 2021 ||  || 22 || 22 || 15 || 15 || 319 || 257 || 576 || 79 || 122 || 0.7 || 0.7 || 14.5 || 11.7 || 26.2 || 3.6 || 5.5 ||

|- class="sortbottom"
! colspan=3| Career
! 154
! 97
! 106
! 2015
! 1706
! 3721
! 548
! 733
! 0.6
! 0.7
! 13.1
! 11.1
! 24.2
! 3.6
! 4.8
! 53
|}

Notes

References

External links

1995 births
Living people
Sandringham Dragons players
Australian rules footballers from Victoria (Australia)
Greater Western Sydney Giants players
All-Australians (AFL)
Kevin Sheedy Medal winners
People educated at Brighton Grammar School